The Paradox Trail is located in western Montrose County, Colorado and traverses a route of over  through various terrain. The trail was rerouted 17 miles due to a trespass issue near the Tabeguache area north of Nucla in 2017. The trail links with two other long-distance trails in the region, the Tabeguache Trail to the east on the Uncompahgre Plateau and the Kokopelli Trail to the west in the La Sal Mountains of Utah. These three trails together form the "Grand Loop", a grueling 360 mile course.

History
The  trail was established in 1995 by the Colorado Plateau Mountain Bike Trail Association,  Montrose West Recreation, the US Forest Service and the Bureau of Land Management. Funding for the reroute came from the Telluride Foundation, the Colorado Historical Society, Montrose County and the Colorado Parks and Wildlife Trails Grant fund for the 17 mile reroute project bringing the Paradox Trail within a quarter of a mile to the Town of Nucla. .

Route description

Some areas qualify as single track because of the trail width and there are a least five "hike-a-bike" sections to be negotiated. While there are trail sections that utilize some seasonally graded county roads, much of the Paradox Trail is inaccessible to motorized vehicles although vehicle access points exist at many places. Wildlife such as elk, mountain lions, coyotes and rattlesnakes abound throughout the trail.

References

External links
 West End Trails Alliance

Protected areas of Dolores County, Colorado
Bureau of Land Management areas in Colorado
Uncompahgre National Forest
Mountain biking venues in the United States
Protected areas established in 1995
1995 establishments in Colorado